Amadou Ciré Baal (born 23 October 1951) is a Senegalese sports shooter. He competed in the men's 50 metre free pistol event at the 1984 Summer Olympics.

References

1951 births
Living people
Senegalese male sport shooters
Olympic shooters of Senegal
Shooters at the 1984 Summer Olympics
Place of birth missing (living people)